Utawali Dam, is an earthfill dam on Utawali river near Mehkar, Buldhana district in the state of Maharashtra in India.

Specifications

Purpose
 Irrigation

See also
 Dams in Maharashtra
 List of reservoirs and dams in India

References

Dams in Buldhana district
Year of establishment missing